The 2022 season of the Knock on Effect New South Wales Cup was the 115th season of the premier state rugby league competition in New South Wales.

Season Summary
The 2022 season of the Knock-On Effect New South Wales Cup commenced on the weekend of 12-13 March, 2022. Teams played 24 regular competition rounds, with the top five teams qualifying for the final series in September.  

Penrith Panthers won the 2022 NSW Cup Grand Final, defeating Canterbury-Bankstown Bulldogs 29–22 at CommBank Stadium to take their fourth premiership.

Teams 
There are 12 teams competing in the 2022 NSW Cup.

Regular Season

Ladder 
The New South Rugby League website maintains a competition ladder and Fixtures List (draw) for the New South Wales Cup.  The website, League Unlimited, also maintain a Ladder for the NSW Cup.

Finals series

Grand Final

First half

Second half

Awards
 Player of the Year: Kayal Iro ( Newtown Jets)

Team of the Year

See Also
2022 New South Wales Rugby League

References

2022 in Australian rugby league
Rugby league in New South Wales
Rugby league competitions in New South Wales